Amador City (formerly Amadore's Creek or South Amador) is a city in Amador County, California, United States.  The population was 185 as of the 2010 Census, down from 196 in 2000, making it the least populous incorporated city in California. Amador City is also noted for being the smallest city in California by area.

Geography 

Only two miles (3.2 km) from Sutter Creek on Old Highway 49, Amador City is the state's smallest incorporated city by area.

History

Amador City was originally settled in 1849 at what is now Turner Road and Amador Creek (an old wagon road between Drytown and Sutter Creek) by several groups of gold panners who were drawn to the area.  One of the groups was the Sunol Group.  The Sunol group included José María Amador. José María Amador panned the creek, but his primary success was providing supplies that he brought from his rancheria in the San Ramon area. José María Amador left the group after six months, returning to his rancheria. The rancheria had suffered during his absence, and he needed to care for his ailing wife. José María Amador must have made a significant impression among the other panners. The creek, city and County eventually carried the name "Amador", the city taking its name from the county.

Early in 1851  gold quartz veins were discovered along the same creek but further west.  Arrastras were brought to the area to crush the quartz.  Shortly stamps mills were brought in to process the hard quartz that the gold veins were embedded in.  By September two stamp mills were erected along Amador Creek.  These stamp mills were so remarkable that it drew the attention of Eadweard Muybridge.  He photographed the area and 3D images taken in 1851 were made of the stamp mills.

Amador City was incorporated as a city on June 2, 1915.

Demographics

2010
At the 2010 census Amador City had a population of 185. The racial makeup of Amador City was 171 (92.4%) White, 0 (0.0%) African American, 4 (2.2%) Native American, 2 (1.1%) Asian, 0 (0.0%) Pacific Islander, 2 (1.1%) from other races, and 6 (3.2%) from two or more races. Hispanic or Latino of any race were 11 people (5.9%).

The whole population lived in households, no one lived in non-institutionalized group quarters and no one was institutionalized.

There were 85 households, 22 (25.9%) had children under the age of 18 living in them, 35 (41.2%) were opposite-sex married couples living together, 9 (10.6%) had a female householder with no husband present, 3 (3.5%) had a male householder with no wife present.  There were 10 (11.8%) unmarried opposite-sex partnerships, and 0 (0%) same-sex married couples or partnerships. 26 households (30.6%) were one person and 9 (10.6%) had someone living alone who was 65 or older. The average household size was 2.18.  There were 47 families (55.3% of households); the average family size was 2.74.

The age distribution was 37 people (20.0%) under the age of 18, 18 people (9.7%) aged 18 to 24, 40 people (21.6%) aged 25 to 44, 65 people (35.1%) aged 45 to 64, and 25 people (13.5%) who were 65 or older.  The median age was 43.5 years. For every 100 females, there were 94.7 males.  For every 100 females age 18 and over, there were 100.0 males.

The homeowner vacancy rate was 6.9%; the rental vacancy rate was 8.8%.  111 people (60.0% of the population) lived in owner-occupied housing units and 74 people (40.0%) lived in rental housing units.

2000
At the 2000 census there were 196 people in 85 households, including 54 families, in the city. The racial makeup of the city was 90.82% White, 1.02% Native American, 4.08% from other races, and 4.08% from two or more races. Hispanic or Latino of any race were 9.18%.

There were 85 households, 23.5% had children under the age of 18 living with them, 43.5% were married couples living together, 15.3% had a female householder with no husband present, and 35.3% were non-families. 27.1% of households were made up of individuals, and 10.6% had someone living alone who was 65 or older.  The average household size was 2.31 and the average family size was 2.76.

The age distribution was 19.4% under the age of 18, 7.7% from 18 to 24, 27.0% from 25 to 44, 32.7% from 45 to 64, and 13.3% 65 or older.  The median age was 42 years.  For every 100 females, there were 92.2 males.  For every 100 females age 18 and over, there were 100.0 males.

The median household income was $45,625 and the median family income was $39,861. Males had a median income of $30,313 versus $16,250 for females. The per capita income for the city was $17,963.  About 14.0% of families and 22.9% of the population were below the poverty line, including 42.5% of those under the age of 18 and none of those 65 and older.

Government and politics

Education  
There are currently no schools within Amador City's boundaries. The city is serviced by Amador High School, Ione Junior High and Sutter Creek Elementary.

Points of interest

Traveling the two blocks on Highway 49 the traveler can see signs of abandonment in this once thriving city, a contrast to the time when the placers and underground mines produced in abundance.  An abandoned brick building stands next to the Fleehart Store, a beautiful reflection of the stone masonry of the time.  Also on Main Street is the old Imperial Hotel, another example of the beautiful brickwork of California's past. A bridge replacement project completed in 2014 has beautified and revitalized the center of the city, providing patio dining at the Imperial Hotel, new public restrooms and improved access to the many quaint shops, wine tasting rooms and purveyors of unique, tasty comestibles.

Little Amador Railroad — Remnants remain of an incredibly-detailed G-Scale model train set in a garden that featured miniature mines and mills and turn-of-the-century full-size mining equipment. It is currently unused.
Amador City Cemetery — located behind the Imperial Hotel. Visitors can take a self-guided tour of the  cemetery that dates back to the beginning of the town. Historic Highway 49
Amador Whitney Museum — located in one of the oldest commercial buildings in town, dating back 1860, the museum collects and displays items related to history and culture of the Mother Lode region. The museum is named after Mr. Whitney, an antique dealer, that bequeathed the building to the city of Amador to be used as a museum. Amador Whitney Museum

References

External links
 
 Amador city 360 Image(Java)

Cities in Amador County, California
Incorporated cities and towns in California
Populated places established in 1853
1853 establishments in California